The Groves Classification is a numbering system to enable the shape of any academic gown or hood to be easily described and identified. It was devised by Nicholas Groves to establish a common terminology for hoods and gowns to remedy the situation of individual universities using differing terms to describe the same item. As such it is used in same manner as an heraldic blazon whereby a textual description enables a coat of arms to be drawn. The system was first described in the Burgon Society's annual in 2001 and adopted as standard by robe makers and scholars of academic dress.

Classes

The original Groves Classification included a standardization for shapes and patterns of hoods and gowns worn by graduates and undergraduates. Further information was given regarding the use of different fabrics and standardization of colors, but the focus was placed on gowns and hoods which are explained further below.

The Classification undergoes periodic revision as new hood and gown patterns emerge.

Hoods
Hoods in the Classification are divided into three different types as summarised in the table below. Unlike the gowns and robes, these are based on the shape of the hood rather than the degrees for which they are worn.

[f] full shape hoods are those that have a cape, a cowl and a liripipe.
[s] simple shape hoods have only a cowl and a liripipe.
[a] Aberdeen shape hoods have only a cape and a vestigial cowl.

Gowns
Gowns in the Groves system are divided into three classes. These generally follow the shapes associated with each different academic degree in the British educational system. 
[b] bachelor's gowns typically have large open sleeves
[m] master's gowns typically have long closed sleeves with armhole at elbow level
[d] doctor's robes vary in shape widely between institutions and are all classed as [d].

Bachelors

Masters

Doctors

Headwear

Additions
The Groves classification system was first published in 2001. Since that time, it has been adapted and changed to include newly devised academic dress and revisions of existing schemes. The Burgon Society maintains a comprehensive listing of system shapes on its website. In addition to those included above, the current list classifies undergraduate gowns in use throughout the United Kingdom and academic headwear.

American doctoral robes

In 2012, David Boven devised a system of classification to include unique doctoral robes in the United States of America. The Intercollegiate Code describes the form of dress for doctors at American institutions, but many have changed the colors of their robes. Several institutions have even developed unique forms of robes for the doctoral graduates. In all of these instances, there are some cases where

ICC Shape

Unique shapes

References

Further reading
Nicholas Groves (ed.) (2011) Shaw's Academical Dress of Great Britain and Ireland; 3rd ed. Published by the Burgon Society, 

Academic dress
Classification systems